Brush Creek is an unincorporated community and coal town in Boone County, West Virginia, United States. Their post office  has closed.

References 

Unincorporated communities in West Virginia
Coal towns in West Virginia
Unincorporated communities in Boone County, West Virginia